The siege of Tripolitsa or fall of Tripolitsa, also known as the Tripolitsa massacre, was an early victory of the revolutionary Greek forces in the summer of 1821 during the Greek War of Independence, which had begun earlier that year, against the Ottoman Empire. Tripolitsa was an important target, because it was the administrative center of the Ottomans in the Peloponnese.

Following the capture of the city by the Greek revolutionary forces, a massacre of its Turkish and Jewish population occurred.

Background
Situated at the center of the Peloponnese, Tripolitsa was the pre-eminent town in southern Greece, and the capital of the Morea Eyalet (first-level province of the Ottoman Empire) since 1786, which made it an important target for the Greek revolutionaries. Many rich Turks and Jews lived there, together with Ottoman refugees, such as Turks and Albanians from Vardounia (Βαρδούνια), who had been driven there by the outbreak of the revolt and escaped massacres in the country's southern districts.

It was also a potent symbol for revenge since its Greek population had been massacred by the Ottoman forces a few months earlier, after the failed rebellion at Moldavia in early 1821. Other massacres of the town's Greeks had occurred in 1715 (during the Ottoman reconquest of the Morea) and on Holy Monday, 29 March 1770, after the failed Orlov Revolt.
The de facto commander in chief of the Greek forces, Theodoros Kolokotronis, now focused on the province's capital. He set up fortified camps in the surrounding places and established several headquarters under the command of his captain, Anagnostaras in the nearby villages, notably Zarachova, Piana, Dimitsana and Stemnitsa, where local peasants provided his men with food and supplies.

In addition, a fresh and compact force of Maniot troops under Petros Mavromichalis, the Bey of Mani, arrived and camped at Valtetsi so as to take part in the final assault to the Ottoman capital of Morea. Arvanites were present alongside Greek revolutionaries during the siege and the massacre that followed. Other commanders present at the siege were Bouboulina, Panagiotis Rodios, Olivier Voutier, Maxime Raybaud as chief of the artillery, Kanellos Deligiannis and Demetrios Ypsilantis (left before the city was taken).

The Ottoman (Turkish and Albanian)  garrison was reinforced in May by some troops and cavalry sent by Hursid Pasha from the north and was led by the Kehayabey Mustafa.

The rebels' decisive victory in the Battle of Valtetsi and several other victorious clashes, such as those in Doliana and Vervena, meant that the Greek revolutionaries had effective control over most areas in the centre and the south of the Peloponnese.

Siege
Although the siege had been going on for several months, its progress was slow, as the Greeks were unable to maintain a tight blockade and were often scattered by sorties of Turkish cavalry. During the early stages of the siege, the Ottoman garrison could sortie and forage for supplies, but after the Battle of the Trench in August, that was no longer possible, and the blockade became tighter.

Conditions worsened inside the walls for the scarcity of food and potable water. Taking advantage of that, Kolokotronis began quiet negotiations with the leaders of the besieged, aiming at an orderly capitulation. He convinced the Albanian contingent, led by Elmas Bey, to make a separate agreement for safe passage to Argos, thereby greatly reducing the strength of the defenders. The deal itself was guaranteed by Dimitrios Plapoutas, the renowned Koliopoulos. The city was taken before the 2,500 Albanians had departed, but they had a safe passage out of the Peloponnese a few days after the fall.

Greek leaders were in constant contact with the Ottoman defenders in negotiations but without much co-ordination. The successive petitions of the remaining Ottoman defenders for a truce were in the end, regarded by the besiegers as a temporizing ruse in ultimately-hopeless anticipation of Ottoman reinforcements. In anticipation of the fall of the city, by September 22, about 20,000 Greeks had gathered around it. On September 23, the Greeks broke in through a blind spot in the walls, and the town was completely overrun quickly. The fortified citadel in it surrendered three days later for lack of water.

Massacre of civilians

In the three days following the city's capture, the Muslims (Turks and others) and the Jewish inhabitants of Tripolitsa were exterminated. The total number of Muslims killed during the sack was estimated by Thomas Gordon, who arrived in the city shortly after its fall, at 8,000. Beyond the 2,500 Albanian troops vouched for in advance; a tiny contingent of Turkish cavalry escaping to Nauplion; a few women who were taken as slaves; along with the harem of Hurshid Pasha; and a few notable Turks held for ransom were spared. The Ottoman official historian of the time, Seyyid Mehmed Es'ad Efendi, stated that none of the Jews were spared, and that of the Turks, only 97 were spared for ransom.

Justin McCarthy stated that the perdition of the Turks in Greece, with the looting and massacres in the Peloponnese, was not the usual demise of the war; all of the Turks, including women and children, were taken away and killed by Greeks. The only exception was the enslavement of a few women and children.

Kolokotronis says in his memoirs:

Inside the town they had begun to massacre. ... I rushed to the place ... If you wish to hurt these Albanians, I cried, "kill me rather; for, while I am a living man, whoever first makes the attempt, him will I kill the first." ... I was faithful to my word of honor ... Tripolitsa was three miles in circumference. The [Greek] host which entered it, cut down and were slaying men, women, and children from Friday till Sunday. Thirty-two thousand were reported to have been slain. One Hydriote [boasted that he had] killed ninety. About a hundred Greeks were killed; but the end came [thus]: a proclamation was issued that the slaughter must cease. ... When I entered Tripolitsa, they showed me a plane tree in the market-place where the Greeks had always been hanged. I sighed. "Alas!" I said, "how many of my own clan – of my own race – have been hanged there!" And I ordered it to be cut down. I felt some consolation then from the slaughter of the Turks. ... [Before the fall] we had formed a plan of proposing to the Turks that they should deliver Tripolitsa into our hands, and that we should, in that case, send persons into it to gather the spoils together, which were then to be apportioned and divided among the different districts for the benefit of the nation; but who would listen?

There were about one hundred foreign officers present at the scenes of atrocities and looting committed in Tripolitsa, Friday to Sunday. Based upon eyewitness accounts and descriptions provided by these officers, William St. Clair wrote:

Upwards of ten thousand Turks were put to death. Prisoners who were suspected of having concealed their money were tortured. Their arms and legs were cut off and they were slowly roasted over fires. Pregnant women were cut open, their heads cut off, and dogs' heads stuck between their legs. From Friday to Sunday the air was filled with the sound of screams... One Greek boasted that he personally killed ninety people. The Jewish colony was systematically tortured... For weeks afterwards starving Turkish children running helplessly about the ruins were being cut down and shot at by exultant Greeks... The wells were poisoned by the bodies that had been thrown in...

The Turks of Greece left few traces. They disappeared suddenly and finally in the spring of 1821 unmourned and unnoticed by the rest of the world....It was hard to believe then that Greece once contained a large population of Turkish descent, living in small communities all over the country, prosperous farmers, merchants, and officials, whose families had known no other home for hundreds of years...They were killed deliberately, without qualm or scruple, and there was no regrets either then or later.

The massacre at Tripolitsa was the final and largest in a sequence of massacres against Muslims in the Peloponnese during the first months of the revolt. Historians estimate that upwards of twenty thousand Muslim men, women and children were killed during this time, often with the exhortation of the local clergy.

Accounts of the behavior of the Greek forces during the atrocity, and the religious exhortations associated with them, closely resemble what St. Clair describes as the longstanding Ottoman methods employed in the Massacre of Chios, suffered by the Greeks themselves eight months later, in 1822.

Steven Bowman believes that, although the Jews were murdered, they were not targeted specifically, in fact: "Such a tragedy seems to be more a side-effect of the butchering of the Turks of Tripolis, the last Ottoman stronghold in the South where the Jews had taken refuge from the fighting, than a specific action against Jews per se." A friend of Kolokotronis, Anagnostis Zafeiropoulos, along with Fotios Chrysanthopoulos, rescued a Jewish family named Hanam before the siege. During the siege and the subsequent massacre, another Jew, called Levi, was rescued personally by Kolokotronis himself.

During the siege, eight Greek Orthodox prelates of Peloponnese were incarcerated inside the city, and five of them died before the fall.

Aftermath
The capture of the city of Tripolis had a salutary effect on the morale of the revolutionaries. The Greeks then saw that their way towards victory was possible and secured approximately 11,000 arms, with the entire Peloponnese bearing hardly any trace of Ottomans anymore.

On the other hand, it also marked the first strong point of discord in what had been an apparently-cohesive force since the atrocities committed during the siege were at the time strongly decried and criticised by some Phanariote figures of the Greek War of Independence such as Dimitrios Ypsilantis and Alexandros Mavrokordatos.

The residual bitterness over the ultimate disposition of the spoils, along with the generalized anarchy following the fall of the city, emphasised the divergent perspectives between the Peloponnesian chieftains (military faction) and the intellectual mentors of the uprising (political faction). In time, they would develop into an internal conflict and later into civil wars within the same struggle for independence.

See also
Navarino massacre
List of massacres in Greece
Massacres during the Greek Revolution
Hymn to Liberty

References

Sources 
 Phillips, Alison W. The War of Greek Independence, 1821 to 1833. London, 1897.
 General Makriyannis, Απομνημονευματα (Memoirs). Athens, 1907
 William St. Clair. That Greece Might Still Be Free The Philhellenes in the War of Independence. London: Oxford University Press, 1972. 
 Stratiki Poti. To Athanato 1821. Ekdosis Stratiki Bros. Athens, 1990.
 Kolokotronis, Theodoros. Memoirs. Ekdosis Vergina. Athens, 2002.
Digitised online copy of Elizabeth M. Edmonds' English translation, Kolokotrones, the Klepht and the Warrior, Sixty Years of Peril and Daring. An autobiography. London, 1892.
 Diamantouros, Nikiforos. The beginning of the constitution of the modern state of Greece. Athens, 2002.
 Finlay, George. History of the Greek revolution, Volume 1. William Blackwood and Sons, Edinburgh and London, 1861. Online copy
 Grenet, Mathieu. La fabrique communautaire. Les Grecs à Venise, Livourne et Marseille, 1770-1840. Athens and Rome, École française d'Athènes and École française de Rome, 2016

Conflicts in 1821
Tripoli
Massacres in Greece
Tripoli, Greece
Ottoman Peloponnese
History of Arcadia, Peloponnese
1821 in the Ottoman Empire
Ethnic cleansing in Europe
Jewish Greek history
Persecution of Ottoman Muslims
Peloponnese in the Greek War of Independence
Massacres of Muslims
Persecution of Balkan Turks